ʿAbd al-Raḥmān ibn ʿAbd Allāh ibn ʿUthmān ibn ʿAbd Allāh ibn Rabīʿa al-Thaqafī, called Ibn Umm al-Ḥakam, was a governor and military leader in the early Umayyad Caliphate. He was a nephew of the Caliph Muʿāwiya I through the latter's sister, Umm al-Ḥakam, and her Thaqafī husband.

According to al-Ṭabarī, Ibn Umm al-Ḥakam campaigned in Byzantine territory in 673. In 678, his uncle appointed him governor of Kūfa in place of al-Ḍaḥḥak ibn Qays. According to Ibn Khayyāt, however, this took place a year earlier. According to al-Ṭabarī, he governed for two years. He dealt with a Kharijite rebellion, but his rule was considered oppressive and he was forced out by the Kūfans. In 679, he was replaced by al-Nuʿmān ibn Bashīr.

Having been ousted from Kūfa, Ibn Umm al-Ḥakam was appointed governor of Egypt by his uncle. According to al-Ṭabarī, he was prevented from taking up his office by Muʿāwiya ibn Ḥudayj al-Sakūnī, who reportedly said, "by my life, you shall not treat us the way you treated our Kūfan brothers". This story is also found in Ibn Taghrībardī and Ibn al-Athīr, but it al-Sakūnī is known to have died in 672. The cause of the discrepancy in the accounts is unclear.

According to al-Balādhurī, Ibn Umm al-Ḥakam also served as governor of the Jazīra and Mosul. The Caliph ʿAbd al-Malik ibn Marwān (685–705) appointed him governor of Damascus.

The prominent Andalusian leaders Tammām ibn ʿAlḳama al-Thaqafī and Tammām ibn ʿAlḳama al-Wazīr were descended from a mawlā (freedman) of Ibn Umm al-Ḥakam and took their nisba from him.

Notes

Bibliography

7th-century births
7th-century Arabs
Generals of the Umayyad Caliphate
Umayyad governors of Kufa
Umayyad governors of Mosul
Umayyad governors of Damascus
Banu Thaqif